Symphyotrichum drummondii (formerly Aster drummondii) is a species of flowering plant of the  family Asteraceae native to the central and eastern United States. Commonly known as Drummond's aster, it is a perennial, herbaceous plant that may reach  in height.

Gallery

Taxonomy
In addition to the autonym of S. drummondii var. drummondii, there is an accepted infraspecies native to the south-central United States and northeast Mexico named S. drummondii var. texanum.

Citations

References

drummondii
Flora of the United States
Plants described in 1835
Taxa named by John Lindley